Ten Precepts may refer to:

 Ten precepts in Buddhism, observed by samaneras and numerous female monastic communities
 Ten Precepts (Taoism)